The Château Gütsch is a historic château in Lucerne, Switzerland.

In 1859, Burkhard Pfyffer bought a plot of land on the Gütsch hill from the town and was granted the right to run an inn. The inn was then bought by Ignaz Businger in 1879 and expanded into a hotel. Like many hotels of the Belle Epoque, The Château Gütsch was built on a vantage point above lakes, rivers, and cities, in this case the city Lucerne and the river Reuss. The Château was built in 1884 specifically to support the hotel.

In 1868 Queen Victoria stayed at a site near the hotel with Prince Arthur and Princess Louise.

As part of a significant transalpine railroad development and modernization plan in Switzerland in the second half of the 19th century, a railline was built connecting Lucerne to the château.

A large part of the hotel was completely destroyed in the great fire of 1888. In 1901 the hotel received its present appearance, being modelled after Neuschwanstein in Bavaria.

It was purchased by Evgeny Lebedev in 2012, who commissioned Martyn Lawrence Bullard to renovate it.

The current owner is Kirill Androsov.

References

Residential buildings completed in the 19th century
Buildings and structures in Lucerne
Hotels in Switzerland
19th-century architecture in Switzerland